The Confederate States War Department was a cabinet-level department in the Confederate States of America government responsible for the administration of the affairs of the Confederate States Army. The War Department was led by the Confederate States Secretary of War. During its existence, the War Department was the largest department of the Civil Service in Confederate States of America.

History
The War Department was established by Act No. 26 of the Confederate Provisional Congress on February 26, 1861.

Organization

Key Personnel
There were twelve key positions in the War Department of which four were filled by civilians and eight by military personnel; these positions were:
Secretary of War (civilian)
Adjutant and Inspector General: Gen. Samuel Cooper
Assistant Secretary of War (civilian): Albert Taylor Bledsoe, John Archibald Campbell
Chief of the Bureau of War (civilian): Robert Garlick Hill Kean
Chief of Conscription: Brig. Gen. Gabriel J. Rains, Brig. Gen. Charles W. Field, Brig. Gen. John S. Preston
Chief of Nitre and Mining: Col. Isaac M. St. John, Col. Richard Morton
Chief of Ordnance: Brig. Gen. Josiah Gorgas
Chief Signal Officer: Col. William Norris
Commissary General of Subsistence: Col. Lucius B. Northrop, Brig. Gen. Isaac M. St. John
Quartermaster-General: Col. Abraham C. Myers, Brig. Gen. Alexander Lawton
Surgeon General: Col. Samuel P. Moore
Commissioner of Prisoner Exchange: Col. Robert Ould, Col. William Norris
War Department Commissioner of Indian Affairs (civilian): David Hubbard

Departments and Bureaus
The Confederate War Department had several sub-departments in its organization structure.
Adjutant and Inspector-General's Department: Established by an act of the Confederate Congress on 19 April 1862.
Bureau of Engineers: Established by an act of the Confederate Congress  on March 6, 1861.
Bureau of Indian Affairs: Established by two separate acts of the Confederate Provisional Congress on February 21 and March 15, 1861.
Bureau of Foreign Supplies: Established by an act of the Confederate Congress on May 17, 1864
Bureau of Conscription
Established on December 30, 1862.
Bureau of Prison Camps
Bureau of Prisoner Exchange
Established on July 12, 1862.
Commissary Department
Medical Corps
Nitre and Mining Bureau: Established by an act the Confederate Congress on April 11, 1862. The Niter and Mining Bureau was initially a part of the Bureau of Ordnance, but later became a full bureau independent of the Bureau of Ordnance on April 22, 1862.
Bureau of Ordnance: Established April 8, 1861 under Article 44 of the Confederate Army Regulations.
Quartermaster-General Department: Established by an act of the Confederate Provisional Congress on February 26, 1861.
Signals Bureau: Established by an act of the Confederate Congress on 19 April 1862. This bureau was attached to the Adjutant General's office. Edward Porter Alexander was responsible for this corp's establishment. Although officially established in 1862, Edward Porter Alexander had set about the creation of a signal service and had a signal service operational in time for the First Battle of Manassas, months before any comparable Federal counterpart would emerge. The Signal Bureau was also involved in the gathering of intelligence during the course of the war.

See also 

 Confederate States Department of the Navy

References

 
1861 establishments in the Confederate States of America
1865 disestablishments in the Confederate States of America
Government agencies established in 1861
Government agencies disestablished in 1865